The Stade de Moutendé is an association football field in Apatou, French Guiana. The stadium is home to ASC Agouado of the French Guiana Honor Division, and has a capacity of 1,000 people.

References

Football venues in French Guiana
Athletics (track and field) venues in French Guiana
Buildings and structures in Apatou